Doug or Douglas Gray may refer to:

 Doug Gray (born 1948), American musician
 Dougie Gray (1905–1972), Scottish footballer
 Douglas Gray (cricketer) (1936-2004), New Zealand cricketer
 Douglas Gray (1930-2020), British clown, member of 1950s–1960s comedy troupe The Alberts